VéliVert' is a bike sharing scheme in Saint-Étienne, France launched in June 2010, by STAS. This community bicycle program comprises 400 long term renting bicycles and 300 short term renting bicycles.
The bicycles are secured in 30 bicycle stations by a special fork, in easy to install bicycle stands with mechanical keys distributed by automatic dispensers, with or without Smart Credit Card terminals, phone and international Credit Cards are as well possible to retrieve immediately a client subscription number.

The system is designed and assembled in France and accessible 24 hours per day, 7 days per week.

Smoove the firm engineering this solution, duplication of the Vélopop' and Valence, Drome: Libélo systems, with more gears (7 in hub gears) and 2 kg lighter. This system was chosen by Avignon and Valence.

Photos

References

External links

 Official site.
 VéliVert iPhone app.

Community bicycle programs
Saint-Étienne
Transport in Auvergne-Rhône-Alpes
Bicycle sharing in France